Scrobipalpa bahrainica is a moth in the family Gelechiidae. It was described by Povolný in 1966. It is found in Iran and Bahrain.

The forewings are dirty white, with seven to eight dark oval dots at the margin of the wing tip and there is a black dot in the centre of the wing. The hindwings are silvery white.

References

Scrobipalpa
Moths described in 1966